Mirhuseyn Seyidov (born 10 August 1992) is an Azerbaijani midfielder

Career

Club

Neftchi Baku
Seyidov started his football career in his early years in Sharur where he was born and raised. He came to Baku when he was 15 years old. In 2007, after 6-month training in youth squad of Inter Baku Seyidov was invited to Neftchi Baku by prominent football coach Islam Kerimov.

Seyidov scored a long distance goal in the away match against Slovenian FC Koper in the second qualification round of the 2014-15 UEFA Europa League which ended 0-2 for Neftchi Baku.

Keshla
On 30 November 2017, Keshla FK confirmed that they had terminated Seyidov's contract due to suspicion of manipulating matches.  The following day, 1 December 2017, Seyidov was banned from all footballing activities by the AFFA.

International
Seyidov made his Azerbaijan under-17 debut in 2007 against Russia in UEFA European Under-17 Championship qualifiers. His European debut with Neftchi was in 2011 against Dinamo Zagreb in UEFA Champions League second qualifying round.

Career statistics

Club

Honours
Neftchi Baku
Azerbaijan Premier League: (3) 2010-11, 2011–12, 2012–13
Azerbaijan Cup: (2) 2012-13, 2013–14

References

1992 births
Living people
Azerbaijani footballers
Azerbaijan youth international footballers
Association football midfielders
People from Sharur
Sportspeople involved in betting scandals
Neftçi PFK players
Azerbaijan under-21 international footballers